Elections to the Shetland Islands Council were held on 6 May 1999 as part of Scottish local elections.  The Liberal Democrats won 9 seats, the party's best result in a Shetland Islands Council election.  Nine seats were uncontested.

Aggregate results

Ward results

By-elections since 1999

References

1999
1999 Scottish local elections